Herbert Leuninger (8 September 193228 July 2020) was a German Catholic priest and theologian. He was a human rights activist for asylum in Germany, a co-founder and speaker of the organisation Pro Asyl, helping refugees, and a member of the board of the European Council on Refugees and Exiles. He is remembered as a "loudspeaker" of refugees.

Life 
Leuninger was born in Cologne-Ossendorf, the second of three children of Alois and Elisabeth Leuninger from Mengerskirchen, Westerwald, where he grew up; his brother  also became a priest and theologian. His uncle Franz Leuninger was a Christian trade unionist active in the German resistance to Nazism, who was executed on 1 March 1945 at the Plötzensee Prison.

He was ordained as a priest in Limburg Cathedral on 8 December 1958. In 1970, he was appointed youth pastor (Jugendpfarrer) for the Main-Taunus district. He served as the advisor for migration questions  (Migrationsreferent) to the Bishop of Limburg from 1972 to 1992, under bishops Wilhelm Kempf and  Franz Kamphaus. Leuninger served as a member of the board of the European Council on Refugees and Exiles based in London.

In 1986, he founded with Jürgen Micksch and others in Frankfurt Pro Asyl, a human rights organisation for refugees seeking asylum in Germany. He served as the organisation's spokesman until 1994, then as its referent for Europe until 1998.

Leininger died after a short illness in Limburg at the age of 87.

Awards
 1991:  of the state of Hesse
 1998: , with his brother Ernst Leuninger

References

External links 
 
 
 Herbert Leusinger: Eine Bewegung von unten / 25 Jahre Pro Asyl (in German) evangelisch.de 8 September 2011
 

German human rights activists
21st-century German Roman Catholic priests
1932 deaths
2020 deaths
Clergy from Cologne
Writers from Cologne
20th-century German Roman Catholic priests